Legion Park may refer to:

American Legion Memorial Park, Everett, Washington
Centene Stadium (Great Falls, Montana); formerly Legion Park (1940-2007)
Mort Glosser Amphitheater, Gadsden, Alabama; formerly Legion Park Bowl
Legion State Park, Louisville, Mississippi
Sims Legion Park, Gastonia, North Carolina

See also
Legion Field, Birmingham, Alabama
Legion Field (Greenville, Mississippi)
Kindrick Legion Field, Helena, Montana